Alessandro De Vitis (born 15 February 1992) is an Italian professional footballer who plays as a midfielder for Serie B club Pisa. His father is the Italian striker Antonio De Vitis.

Club career
On 21 August 2009, De Vitis moved from Fiorentina to Parma on a permanent deal. He played two seasons with Parma's youth team before he was loaned to Serie B side Modena in the summer of 2011. He made 24 league appearances in the 42-match season, but completed 90 minutes just twice and 14 of the 24 were from the bench.

The following year, he was loaned out to a Serie B side with better promotion prospects: Padova.

On 31 July 2013, De Vitis was signed by fellow Serie A club U.C. Sampdoria for €2.3 million in a 5-year contract, with Gianni Munari moved to opposite direction for €500,000.

On 2 August 2013, De Vitis was signed by Carpi F.C. 1909. On 7 August 2015 he was signed by SPAL.

International career
De Vitis has represented his country at international level for the under-16, under-17, under-18, under-19 and under-20 sides.

References

External links

Living people
1992 births
Footballers from Verona
Association football midfielders
Italian footballers
Italy youth international footballers
Parma Calcio 1913 players
Modena F.C. players
Calcio Padova players
U.C. Sampdoria players
A.C. Carpi players
S.P.A.L. players
Latina Calcio 1932 players
Pisa S.C. players
Serie B players
Serie C players